Wester Ogle is a historic home located at Pikesville, Baltimore County, Maryland, United States.  It is a large, Federal-influenced house constructed about 1842. It is constructed of stucco-covered stone, and stands three stories high over an excavated basement, three bays wide by one room deep. Also on the property are a -story stone-and-frame tenant house and the stone foundations of a 19th-century barn and a stable. The property upon which Wester Ogle is located has remained in the Lyon family since approximately 1745.

Wester Ogle was listed on the National Register of Historic Places in 1985.

References

External links
, including photo from 1984, at Maryland Historical Trust

Houses on the National Register of Historic Places in Maryland
Houses in Baltimore County, Maryland
Houses completed in 1842
Federal architecture in Maryland
Buildings and structures in Pikesville, Maryland
National Register of Historic Places in Baltimore County, Maryland